Augustine Tawiah (born on Wednesday, 27 September, 1961) is a Ghanaian politician and member of the Seventh Parliament of the Fourth Republic of Ghana representing the Bia West Constituency in the Western North Region on the ticket of the National Democratic Congress.

Early life 
Augustine Tawiah hails from Sefwi Asuopiri in the Western Region

Education 
Augustine Tawiah started his basic school in the Bia District in the current Western North Region, Ghana. He then passed his common entrance exams to be able to go to Secondary School. The Secondary School Augustine Tawiah attended are St. Thomas Aquinas Senior High School (SHS Ordinary Level) and later at Labone Senior High School (SHS Advanced Level).

Augustine Tawiah gained Doctor of Ministry (Applied Theology) in 2006, Doctor of Education Certificate (Leadership and Policy Studies) in 2009, Master of Theology, a Master of Science from the University of Memphis as well as a Certificate in University Teaching. Augustine Tawiah also has a Doctor of Ministry from Harding University, a Master of Arts from Lipscomb University, and a Cert-Hr Training from the University of Oklahoma.

Career and Positions 
Augustine Tawiah works at the Parliament of Ghana as a Member of Parliament (MP). He is a Lecturer and Consultant at Ghana Institute of Management and Public Administration (GIMPA). He held the position as the Executive Secretary for the National Teaching Council in Ghana and also the Academic Dean at Ghana Christian University College.

Politics 

Augustine Tawiah is the Member of Parliament (MP) for Bia West Constituency in the Western North Region.

References 

Ghanaian MPs 2017–2021
1961 births
Living people
National Democratic Congress (Ghana) politicians
Ghanaian MPs 2021–2025